Encarnación means incarnation in Spanish.
Encarnación may also refer to:

People
 Angelo Encarnación (born 1969), Major League Baseball catcher
 Edwin Encarnación (born 1983), Major League Baseball first baseman
 Jerar Encarnación (born 1997), Major League Baseball outfielder
 Jose Encarnacion Jr. (1928–1998), University of the Philippines professor
 Juan Encarnación (born 1976), Major League Baseball outfielder
 Mario Encarnación (1975–2005), Major League Baseball outfielder

Places
 Encarnación, Paraguay
 Encarnación, Peñuelas, Puerto Rico, a barrio in the municipality of Peñuelas, Puerto Rico
 La Encarnación, Honduras
 La Encarnación, a district of Asunción, Paraguay
 Municipality of Encarnación de Diaz, Mexico

Ships
Spanish ship Nuestra Señora de Encarnación
Nuestra Señora de la Encarnación y Desengaño, a Spanish galleon captured by William Dampier in 1709

Other
 Encarnación (sculpting), a sculpting technique
 Encarnación (film), a 2007 film by Anahí Berneri